Rufus Erastus Hart (September 10, 1812 – December 24, 1891) was an American politician and lawyer.

Hart, the son of Joseph and Anna (Hotchkiss) Hart, was born in Middlebury, Ohio, on September 10, 1812.  He graduated from Yale College in 1833.  He studied law at home from 1833 to 1835, and then began practice in Akron, Ohio. In the fall of 1837 he removed to Marietta, where he spent the rest of his life, with the exception of the years from 1852 to 1856, during which he was the principal of the Ohio Asylum for the Blind, at Columbus. He was a member of the Ohio Senate from 1845 to 1847. He died in Marietta, from an attack of the prevailing influenza, on December 24, 1891, in his 80th year.  He married Julia Holden in 1839, by whom he had three sons and three daughters.

1812 births
1891 deaths
Yale College alumni
Ohio lawyers
Ohio state senators
19th-century American politicians
19th-century American lawyers